Danny Le, better known as Shiphtur (pronounced "shifter"), is a Canadian retired League of Legends player who played support for Delta Fox of the NA Challenger Series. Shiphtur was the first esports player to be granted a P-1 athletic visa from the United States Department of State. On May 2, 2014, he joined Dignitas along with Darshan "ZionSpartan" Upadhyaya. On May 17, 2016, Apex Gaming acquired Dignitas' NA Challenger team including Shiphtur.

On September 26, 2016, Apex and Dignitas were acquired by the Philadelphia 76ers, and Shiphtur was released from the Apex Roster but not added to Dignitas.

Tournament results

Team Apex 
9th — 2016 NA LCS Summer regular season
5th–6th — 2016 NA LCS Summer playoffs

References

Living people
Canadian people of Vietnamese descent
Canadian esports players
League of Legends mid lane players
Team Coast (esports) players
Dignitas (esports) players
Apex Gaming players
Twitch (service) streamers
Year of birth missing (living people)